Dave Mussard (born 8 February 1987) is a Seychellois football player and chef. He is a goalkeeper playing for the Seychelles national football team and has represented Seychelles in the AFCON 2018.

Internet Sensation 
Mussard became an internet sensation during the AFCON 2018 qualifiers. He went viral because of his large shape as a goalkeeper, his daytime job is also a chef at a hotel in Seychelles. According to publications, most of the team members have daytime jobs and like Mussard they all had to beg for time off in order to play the AFCON cup.

References 

1987 births
Living people
Seychellois footballers
Association football goalkeepers
Seychelles international footballers